Indonesia competed at the 1972 Summer Olympics in Munich, West Germany.

Competitors 
The following is the list of number of competitors participating in the Games:

Archery 

Women's Individual Competition
 Tjoeij Lin Alienilin - 2100 points (37th place)

Athletics 

 Key
 Note–Ranks given for track events are within the athlete's heat only
 Q = Qualified for the next round
 q = Qualified for the next round as a fastest loser or, in field events, by position without achieving the qualifying target
 NR = National record
 N/A = Round not applicable for the event
 Bye = Athlete not required to compete in round

Boxing

Diving 

Women's 3m Springboard
 Mirnawati Hardjolukito - 188.94 points (30th place)

Weightlifting

See also
 1972 Olympic Games
 1972 Paralympic Games
 Indonesia at the Olympics
 Indonesia at the Paralympics

References 
Official Olympic Reports

Nations at the 1972 Summer Olympics
1972
1972 in Indonesian sport